On 9 March 1989, Cinema Express magazine editor V. Ramamurthy announced the best of South Indian films for the year of 1988, selected by the readers of the magazine. G. Lakshma Reddy, sales manager of Dyanora Television, co-sponsor also announced the Dyanora Gold cine awards for excellence in film industry.

Only four category of awards are selected for the languages Malayalam, Kannada and Telugu.

Tamil

Telugu

Kannada

Malayalam

Dyanora Gold cine awards

References

External links 
 

1989 Indian film awards
Cinema Express Awards